James Broad (9 May 1814 – 27 December 1888) was an English cricketer who played one first-class cricket match for Kent County Cricket Club in 1854.

Broad was born at Cobham, Kent in 1814, the son of William and Sarah Broad. He was a butcher by trade and played regular club cricket for Cobham Cricket Club, a strong club side in Kent cricket at the time. He is recorded as having played in at least 31 matches for the side between 1849 and 1864 as an allrounder who frequently opened the batting.

Broad made his only appearance for Kent against a United England Eleven at The Bat and Ball Ground in Gravesend, close to his home. He was one of fifteen players on the Kent side in the match.

Broad married Mary Bradbear in 1840. He died at Cobham in 1888 aged 74.

Notes

References

External links

1814 births
1888 deaths
English cricketers
Kent cricketers
People from Cobham, Kent